Bridgetta is the Italian version of the Irish name, Bridget. It means strong, or strong willed. Notable people with the name include:

 Bridgetta Tomarchio (born 1978), actress, model, and infomercial host
 Bridgetta Clark (1891–1980), early silent film actress

Italian feminine given names